is a dam in Miyawaka, Fukuoka Prefecture, Japan.  It was completed in 1994.

References 

Dams in Fukuoka Prefecture
Dams completed in 1994